Natalya Fyodorovna Polozkova (née Kozlova; ; born 2 April 1972 in Chelyabinsk) is a retired Russian speed skater. She competed at the 1992, 1994 and 1998 Winter Olympics in the 500, 1000 and 1500 m events with the best achievement of fourth place in the 1500 m in 1992. In 1991 she won a European title in the 500 m as well as a gold medal at the Universiade in the 1500 m event.

Personal bests:
500 m – 40.02 (1998)
 1000 m – 1:18.83 (1998)
 1500 m – 1:56.26 (2001)
 3000 m – 4:08.60 (2001)
 5000 m – 7:32.92 (1999)

Polozkova graduated from the Ural Academy of Physical Education in 1994 and later studied for her PhD there. For 10 years she was married to Georgy Polozkov, the son of the famous Russian speed skater Lidiya Skoblikova.

References

1972 births
Living people
Olympic speed skaters of Russia
Olympic speed skaters of the Unified Team
Speed skaters at the 1992 Winter Olympics
Speed skaters at the 1994 Winter Olympics
Speed skaters at the 1998 Winter Olympics
Sportspeople from Chelyabinsk
Universiade gold medalists for the Soviet Union
Universiade medalists in speed skating